Stigmella rhynchosiella is a moth of the family Nepticulidae. It was described by Vári in 1955. It is found in South Africa (it was described from Pretoria).

The larvae feed on Rhynchosia nitens. They probably mine the leaves of their host plant.

References

Endemic moths of South Africa
Nepticulidae
Moths of Africa
Moths described in 1955